Union Island is part of the nation of Saint Vincent and the Grenadines.

Clifton and Ashton are the two principal towns. The island is home to just under 3,000 residents. The official language is English; however,  French and German are spoken by some merchants in Clifton as well.

The island has an airport, Union Island Airport, with domestic flights to Saint Vincent and some of the Grenadines, as well as international flights to Barbados, Carriacou, Grenada and Martinique.

Geography
Due to its volcanic silhouette, it is also called the Tahiti of the West Indies. Surrounding islands are Tobago Cays, Mayreau, Palm Island, and Petit Saint Vincent.

Union Island has a semi-arid climate. Its hills are not high enough to produce the rainfall that transforms Grenada's northern coastal areas into rainforests. During the dry season (December to June), the only source of water on the island is the water stored during the rainy season (June to December).

History
After the original settlers, the Arawak and Caribs, the island has been in the possession of French and English slave traders and plantation owners. They brought hundreds of Africans to the island, mostly from regions of Africa that are now Nigeria, Cameroon, Angola, and Ghana. Sea island cotton was an important export crop.

When slavery was abolished, people still relied on farming and fishing. As a result, a lot of men went to sea to work on freighters to support their families. Union Island was the centre of some political unrest in the late 1970s when a group of residents were in favour of secession from Saint Vincent and the Grenadines and merger with southern neighbour Grenada. The insurrection was put down by forces of the Saint Vincent and the Grenadines Government.

The U.S. Army Corps of Engineers spent much of a year working on Union Island and completed a new Coast Guard Jetty and shore office at the mouth of Clifton Harbour.

Economy
Today the yacht services business and tourist day-chartering business provide many jobs. There are also numerous boutiques, supermarkets, bars, restaurants, internet cafes and, a dive operator.

There are several hotels and guest houses on Union Island, as well as schools, churches and a small health clinic.

The official currency is the Eastern Caribbean Dollar (XCD), though U.S. dollars (USD) and Euros (EUR) are widely accepted.

Telecommunications services are provided by Cable & Wireless, which offers landline and wireless services (GSM). Digicel offers competing for wireless services, including the network formerly operated by AT&T Wireless/Cingular. High-Speed Internet services are provided by Cable and Wireless (512 kbit/s down, 128 kbit/s up). The island is connected to the Saint Vincent mainland by a series of digital microwave towers (through connections to neighbouring islands of Canouan and Bequia).

WiFi service in the harbour is offered through Internet Cafe-Clifton. Also through HotHotHot Spot, a service offered in Union through Erika's Marine Services, which is also offered in Bequia in the Grenadines, as well as Dominica and Antigua (both Falmouth and English Harbours and Jolly Harbour). Other computer and electronic support is also offered by The Internet Cafe — Clifton.

Local piers and docks earn money by renting their open space to tourists who have chartered sailboats or yachts, charging them by boat length.

In the middle of Clifton harbour sits Happy Island, a man-made island featuring a bar.

Ferry services operate between Clifton and Saint Vincent, Monday, Tuesday, Thursday, Friday and Saturday on the MS Barracouda and the MS Gemstar.
Ferry services also operate bi-weekly between Ashton and Hillsborough, Carriacou (Grenada) on Mondays and Thursdays.

Fauna

The common opossum, locally known as "manicou", can usually only be seen at the end of the dry season.
Common Caribbean birds like the bananaquit are found on the island, as is the ubiquitous blackbird. A recent book (2006) on the fauna of Mustique, a neighbouring island, is an excellent reference. The Union Island gecko, discovered in 2005 is endemic to the island and is currently listed as critically endangered by the International Union for Conservation of Nature.

Tourism

The tourism industry plays an increasing role in Union Island's economy. A large number of yachts visit the island each year, often on their way to the nearby Tobago Cays.
There are a number of local guest houses, including St. Joseph's Roman Catholic Church, the Anchorage Yacht Club, and a small hotel at the Bougainvilla in Clifton.

Turtle watching is conducted by the Union Island Environmental Attackers (UIEA), an environmental non-governmental organization seeking to preserve Union Island. Turtle watching occurs during the Turtle Closed Season (March 1 to July 31), during which time catching or killing of turtles for consumption is forbidden.

There are also a number of bars and restaurants on the island.

Chatham Bay, on the west side of the island, is popular for its remote beach and snorkeling.

A key feature of the Union Island region is the Tobago Cays National Marine Park. The Tobago Cays are a group of small, uninhabited islands surrounded by reefs. Snorkeling, scuba diving and swimming with sea turtles are offered.

The Union Island Sailing Club sponsors two sailing dinghies that participate in local regattae.

Culture
Easter is one of the biggest events on Union Island. Festivities take place in both Ashton and Clifton throughout Holy Week in a festival called "Easterval".

In late May, at the end of the dry season, a significant event is "the Maroon", a celebration which is a day-long affair beginning before dawn and lasting late into the night. The Maroon is known for its drums, dancing and plentiful food. These are meant to entice the Gods to bring on the rains.

Gallery

See also
 - a West Indiaman that sailed between 1794 and 1821

References

External links
Radio Grenadines official website
Travel guide of Union Island with street map of the town
Tobago Cays Marine Park official website
Friends of Union Island - general information

Islands of Saint Vincent and the Grenadines
Windward Islands